Nisco Invest is a Romanian real estate development company focused on the construction of multi-purpose centres, offices, and residential compounds in Transylvania. It is a part of the holding company administered by Dan Călin Nistor of Cluj-Napoca.

Nisco Invest is a member of the International Council of Shopping Centers (ICSC), focused on residential real estate projects for business and multifunctional centres. In 2004 Nisco was awarded third place in the Top Romanian Companies in the real estate transactions category.

External links
Nisco Invest
Akademia Center Cluj

Companies based in Cluj-Napoca